The Island is a miniseries of the computer-animated Ninjago television series (titled Ninjago: Masters of Spinjitzu before the eleventh season). The series was created by Michael Hegner and Tommy Andreasen. The miniseries aired in March 2021, following the thirteenth season titled Master of the Mountain. It is succeeded by the fourteenth season titled Seabound. It consists of four episodes of 11 minutes each, similar to the pilot episodes.

The miniseries follows the storyline of the main ninja characters travelling to an island inhabited by an ancient tribe called the Keepers, who swore to protect an amulet linked to a sea-dwelling creature named Wojira. When Wojira is seemingly awakened from her slumber, the ninja must uncover the truth if they hope to return home safely. The miniseries introduces an artifact called the Storm Amulet, which would return as an important plot element in Seabound, along with Wojira. It also sees the return of Clutch Powers, a character introduced in the eleventh season of the television series.

Voice cast

Main 

 Sam Vincent as Lloyd Garmadon, the Green Ninja
 Vincent Tong as Kai, the red ninja and Elemental Master of Fire
 Michael Adamthwaite as Jay, the blue ninja and Elemental Master of Lightning
 Brent Miller as Zane, the white ninja and Elemental Master of Ice
 Kirby Morrow as Cole, the black ninja and Elemental Master of Earth
 Kelly Metzger as Nya, the Elemental Master of Water and Kai's sister
 Paul Dobson as Sensei Wu, the wise teacher of the ninja
Kathleen Barr as Misako

Supporting 

 Jennifer Hayward as P.I.X.A.L. a female nindroid
Brian Drummond as Twitchy Tim/Zippy
Paul Dobson as Chief Mammatus, the Keeper's leader
 Brian Dobson as Ronin
 Ian James Corlett as Clutch Powers
Paul Dobson as Cecil Putnam
Sam Vincent as Dwayne

Release 
An official poster for The Island was revealed on 14 January 2021, which depicted the ninja characters and an armed totem pole. A sneak peek trailer was released on the Lego YouTube channel on 5 February 2021. This was followed by a full-length official trailer, which was released on 12 February 2021. A short clip introducing the new character Timothy "Twitchy Tim" Batterson was released on 2 March 2021 on YouTube titled Ninjas Meet Twitchy. On 16 May 2021, lead writer Bragi Schut confirmed on Twitter that Seabound is the fourteenth season of the series, but on 10 June of the same year, he clarified that he considers the fourteenth season to be both The Island and Seabound. However, co-creator Tommy Andreasen previously stated on 18 May 2021 that he considers The Island and Seabound to be two different installments.

Plot 
An expedition led by Sensei Wu, Misako, Clutch Powers and his assistants goes missing while exploring an uncharted island in the storm belt. The ninja must pick up their trail with the help of Twitchy Tim. Having journeyed to the island years ago, Tim is still scared to go back due to being struck by lightning twelve times on the island. Reluctantly, he agrees to help. After surviving their journey to the island, the ninja begin to explore it, discovering the abandoned expedition camp.

While making their way across the island, the ninja unexpectedly befriend a dragon and name it Zippy. They are later ambushed by living stone statues that can channel the ninja's elemental powers. While trying to escape the stone guardians, Nya, Zane, Kai and Cole are captured by hostile islanders named the Keepers and encounter Wu, Misako, and Clutch Powers in captivity. Luckily, Lloyd and Tim manage to escape. When the ninja are taken to meet the Keepers' leader, Chief Mammatus, he accuses them of trying to steal an artefact called the Storm Amulet, which was pried from the head of a giant sea serpent named Wojira, placing the beast into a deep sleep. For thousands of years, the Keepers have upheld a vow to the First Spinjitzu Master to protect the amulet from Wojira.

The ninja are imprisoned, while Jay is taken to an unknown location by the Keepers, who refer to him as "The Gift of Jay". Lloyd finds the Keepers' village and frees the ninja with the help of Zippy. Meanwhile, Clutch Powers tries to steal the amulet, but he and the ninja are recaptured. They have to watch Jay being sacrificed by the Keepers to appease the reawakened spirit of Wojira.

However, when Lloyd finds a wooden tooth, he begins to suspect that Wojira is fake. He informs Chief Mammatus, who tells him that since Wojira returned, the Keepers have been giving away their treasure to appease her. When Jay reaches a hidden cave along the coast, he discovers that it is a secret hideout for thugs who have escaped from Kryptarium Prison and that Ronin came up with the scheme to trick the Keepers into giving him their treasure. While the ninja are battling Ronin's henchmen, Ronin tries to escape but is stopped by Tim, who conquers his fear and crashes into his fake Wojira boat. In the aftermath, Clutch Powers tries to steal the Storm Amulet again, but is stopped by Nya, and the ninja befriend the Keepers. In the final scene, the real Wojira is shown sleeping in a temple at the bottom of the ocean with another amulet on her forehead.

Episodes 

The episodes have also been alternatively released cut together as a 44-minute special.

References

Primary

Secondary 

Island, the
2021 television specials